Sieglinde was a sonar decoy used during the Second World War by German U-boats. Sieglinde was installed in chambers on the sides of the U-boat. It could be ejected to a considerable distance from the boat when attempting to hide from a seeker's sonar equipment. This allowed the real U-boat to slip away quietly from pursuing ships. It was typically used in combination with Pillenwerfer (or Bold) decoys.

References

External links
 Sonar decoys at uboataces.com

Sonar decoys
Weapons countermeasures
U-boats